Early Iranians had their own regional elected councils. By the time of the Medians, the city-states were administered in a democratic fashion.

During the Achaemenids, in a debate over the constitution of Iran, Otanes argued in favor of democracy, however he did not succeed. He enumerated five characteristic marks of the democracy: 1, an equality of rights for all; 2, the rejection of arbitrary power as ordinarily exercised by eastern princes; 3, appointment to offices by lot; 4, responsibility in office; 5, deliberation in common, and the framing of laws in popular assemblies.

By the time of Parthians, the appointment of kings was through election in the Parthian parliament, Megisthanes. In this way the king could be the representative of the whole nation.

Early Iranians
Regional elected councils are well documented particularly in the Indo-Iranian societies.

Zoroaster's Gathas states that in order to bring peace, prosperity, stability, progress and happiness to the living world, people are to select only competent persons. Song 16 is particularly dedicated to "Vohû Khshathra Vairya," literally "Good Domain Worthy-of-Choice." It shows that an ideal government must be an elected one.

In its most sacred prayer the Ahunavar (Choice of the Lord), Zoroastrians are taught that their Lord and leader are to be chosen, through a Good Mind and only on account of their individual righteousness. This sets the basis for a spiritual and political democracy as far back as nearly four millennia ago.

Zoroaster, the Iranian prophet advised people to listen to all parties and to choose the best of them. He said (Yasna 30, paragraph 2) "O people, listen to others and accept the best of them, and consider them with a bright and deep thinking. Every man and woman should chose the path of good and bad by his/her own." He did not discriminate between man and woman in this regard and counted them equally. In Yasna 30, he said "hearken with your ears to these best counsels, Reflect upon them with illumined judgment. Let each one choose his creed with that freedom of choice each must have at great events. O ye, be awake to these, my announcements."

Medes

Diodorus mentions that after the Assyrians had ruled Asia for five hundred years "they were conquered by the Medes, and thereafter no king arose for many generations to lay claim to supreme power, but the city-states, enjoying a regimen of their own, were administered in a democratic fashion".

Herodotus writes "After Assyrians had ruled upper Asia for five hundred and twenty years, the Medes were the first who began to revolt from them. These, it would seem, proved their bravery in fighting for freedom against the Assyrians; they cast off their slavery and won freedom. Afterwards, the other subject nations, too, did the same as the Medes. All of those on the mainland were now free men; but they came to be ruled by monarchs again, as I will now relate. There was among the Medes a clever man called Deioces: he was the son of Phraortes. Deioces was infatuated with sovereignty, and so he set about gaining it. Already a notable man in his own town (one of the many towns into which Media was divided), he began to profess and practice justice more constantly and zealously than ever, and he did this even though he knew that injustice is always the enemy of justice. Then the Medes of the same town, seeing his behavior, chose him to be their judge, and he (for he coveted sovereign power) was honest and just. By acting so, he won no small praise from his fellow townsmen, to such an extent that when the men of the other towns learned that Deioces alone gave fair judgments (having before suffered from unjust decisions), they came often and gladly to plead before Deioces; and at last they would submit to no arbitration but his. The number of those who came grew ever greater, for they heard that each case turned out in accord with the truth. Then Deioces seeing that everything now depend on him, would not sit in his former sear of judgment, and said he would give no more decisions; for it was of no advantage to him (he said) to leave his own business and spend all day judging the cases of his neighbors. This caused robbery and lawlessness to increase greatly in the towns; and, gathering together, the Medes conferred about their present affairs, and said (here, as IP suppose, the main speakers were Deioces' friends), 'since we cannot go on living in the present way in the land, come, let us set up a king over us; in this way the land will be well governed, and we ourselves shall attend to our business and not be routed by lawlessness.' With such words they persuaded themselves to be ruled by a king."
 So in this way people were electing their kings.

Achaemenids

Herodotus puts great emphasis on the fact that the proposals put forward included the idea of establishing "democracy" in Persia. Herodotus in Histories gives an account on a debate over the constitution of Iran (Persia) in 522 BC, where Otanes argued in favor of democracy, the principle of equality before the law, and the accountable government. He advocates a complete democracy, on the grounds that under a democratic system "offices of state are exercised by lot".

In that session, Otanes also talked about the disadvantages of monarchy. He notes that democratic rule does not share any of the malice of a tyranny. Otanes was one of the seven members who overthrew Gaumata.

He recommended that the management of public affairs should be entrusted to the whole nation. He said, "it seems advisable, that we should no longer have a single man to rule over us. the rule of one is neither good nor pleasant... How indeed is it possible that monarchy should be a well-adjusted thing, when it allows a man to do as he likes without being answerable?... I vote, therefore, that we do away with monarchy, and raise the people to power. For the people are all in all."

Otanes seems to find democracy inherently more equitable: "the rule of many has first a name attaching to it which is the fairest of all names, that is to say 'Equality.'" Popular government ensures moderate rule, he suggests.

The book "The Archaic Smile of Herodotus" notes that "in arguing that democracy will be good for Persia, Otanes contradicts himself, for he proposes to change the traditional form of government. This violation of ancient custom is just the practice of which he accuses tyrants." However Otanes was advocating a return to the equality and democracy that was customary in ancient Persia. So violation of these customs was what he was accusing tyrants about. Perhaps Otanes considered democracy reflecting Persia's tribal roots.

Even though Otanes has not used the term demokratia in his speech, but his emphasis on equality under the law, elections by lot, and collective decisions makes it clear that he represents the democratic viewpoint. Some scholars have gone further by considering that not only Otanes was in fact advocating the democracy, but also "a pretty radical form of it".

Some scholars have tended to equate Otanes' arguments with those of the author himself (Herodotus). Others have titled Otanes as "the champion of democracy".

According to Aristotle the three parts of a politeia are the deliberative, the magistracies, and the judiciary. This tripartite structure of the politeia was a traditional idea; Aristotle only elaborated upon it. The threefold division is already evident in Otanes' defence of democracy, where he defends democracy for its virtues in all three areas.

From the viewpoint of the methodological approach, Otanes provided a "practical example" of Cambyses, that how he acted as a monarch in power. The moral force of Otanes' argument derives from his conviction that monarchy and oligarchy have proven untrustworthy, insofar as natural vanity is bount to corrupt even good individuals if left unchecked.

In addition to book 3, later in book 6 Herodotus once again insists that the account of the debate is historical, and he vents his spleen at those who deny that Otanes advised the Persians to demokrateesthai.

Arsacids
At the time of Parthians, kings were elected through the Parthian parliament, Magistan (in Greek: Megisthanes). The parliament was of two parts: one of the wise men and magi from across the country, and the second the relatives of the royal family.

The two parts separately and together, were forming three different councils. The third one being the result of assembling of the members of two other councils in cases of emergency, where this council (of the two other councils) was called as Megisthanes. Strabo writes that "the Council of the Parthians, according to Poseidonius, consists of two groups, one that of kinsmen, and the other that of wise men and Magi, from both of which groups the kings were appointed." The number of wise men in the parliament was more than that of the magis.

Megisthanes was the first parliament of Iran. It can be concluded that the Parthian parliament was the result of the achievements of past civilizations specially the Achaemenids (who had their own councils) and Greeks. Justin (41.2.2), has called this parliament as senate. Tacitus states that the parliament was composed of 300 of the rich and wise men, which was forming a council like that of the senate. People are in charge of their legitimate power. Until the parliament and people have consensus, they are not afraid of the Parthian kings, but as soon as there appears a disagreement between them, each one of them (people, and the parliament) chose a party for themselves until their party succeeds. The events of the time of the Artabanus III and his removal and reinstallation are the best example of democracy and show the role of parliament in retention of the king in power. In the council of aristocrats and nobles, which was composed of the seven famous and popular families in addition to Arsacids family, other families like Sooren, Karan, and Espahpat were also part. This tradition should have come down from the time of Achaemenids where they had seven famous families in a council.

The first session of the Megisthanes parliament, was held in Nowruz of the year 137 BC, where Mithridates I personally attended the council. Its first decision was to make the position of the king an elective position.

Parthian kingdom was not based on absolutism, but there was a parliament where important issues was being resolved there. King was always counseling with the parliament, while the parliament members were not being chosen by the king, so the power of the king was limited by the nation. Justin considers one of the reasons for collapse of Parthian empire, the unlimited power of this parliament and the extreme actions of the parliament members.

References

Democracy
Parthian Empire